Chraibi or Chraïbi is a surname. Notable people with the surname include: 

Driss Chraïbi (1926–2007), Moroccan author
Lamia Chraibi, Franco–Moroccan film producer
Omar Chraïbi (born 1961), Moroccan filmmaker, producer, and screenwriter
Rochdi Chraibi (born 1962), Moroccan cabinet member